Alfred Edward Daff (18 August 1902 – 1991) was an Australian born executive who became head of Universal Pictures.

Biography
Daff was born in Melbourne. He joined the Melbourne office of Universal Pictures at 18 years of age. In 1922 he took early aerial newsreel footage of New Guinea.

In 1924 he made a 20-minute send-up of wrestling called Who's Who In The Wrestling World - And Why?.

In 1935 he visited the Universal Studios in Hollywood. The following year he was appointed in charge of Universal's Japanese territories; two years after that he became Far East supervisor, then also the Middle East. In 1943 he became Universal Foreign Supervisor, covering all markets outside the US.

In 1949 he became President of Universal International Films, the overseas subsidiary of Universal Pictures Company. In 1952 he became Executive Vice President of Universal Pictures Company in 1952. He retired in 1958 but continued working as a consultant until the 1970s.

Daff was married twice and had one daughter.

Al Daff

Daff was the topic of a 1975 documentary Al Daff. The documentary consists of Daff being interviewed by Ken G. Hall. He offered advice for Australian filmmakers and reminisced about his own career.

References

External links
Papers of Al Daff at National Library of Australia

Al Daff film at National Film and Sound Archive
Al Daff at National Film and Sound Archive

1902 births
1991 deaths
Australian filmmakers
Businesspeople from Melbourne